Commonwealth is the fifth studio album by progressive bluegrass band New Grass Revival, released in 1981 on the Flying Fish label. This album was the last one for two band members, Courtney Johnson and Curtis Burch, who cited fatigue with the band's touring schedule.

Track listing 
 "Reach" (Johanna Hall) – 4:48
 "Steam Powered Aereo Plane" (John Hartford) – 4:29
 "One Day I'll Walk" (Bruce Cockburn) – 2:52
 "Nothing Wasted, Nothing Gained" (Steve Brines, Sam Bush) – 2:42
 "Pack of Fools" (Andy Kulberg, Jim Roberts) – 4:45
 "Nothing Without You" (Bryan Hayworth) – 3:51
 "Deeper and Deeper" (Bob Lucas) – 6:12
 "Wicked Path of Sin" (Monroe) – 2:35
 "Sapporo" (Bush) – 8:10

Personnel 
 Sam Bush – mandolin, electric guitar, guitar, fiddle, lead vocals
 John Cowan – electric bass, lead vocals
 Courtney Johnson – banjo, vocals
 Curtis Burch – guitar, Dobro, vocals
 Kenny Malone – drums
 Leon Russell – piano
 Sharon White – vocals
Production notes
 Produced by Sam Bush
 Richard Adler – engineer, mastering supervisor
 Keith Case – executive producer
 Jim Lloyd – mastering
 Willy Matthews – design

See also 
 New Grass Revival discography

References 

New Grass Revival albums
1981 albums